Torresitrachia is a genus of air-breathing land snails, terrestrial pulmonate gastropod mollusks in the family Camaenidae.

Distribution
This genus is endemic to Australia, where it occurs in the tropical north of Queensland (Cape York Peninsula), the Northern Territory (south of the Gulf of Carpentaria and Arnhemland), and Western Australia (Kimberley).

Description
Species of Torresitrachia are characterized by their small to medium-sized, discoidal shell, and a loosely coiling umbilicus. Shells are a uniform brownish in color and exhibit a sculpture of radial ribs or periostracal hairs.

Species
Species within the genus Torresitrachia include:
 Torresitrachia amaxensis Solem, 1979 
 Torresitrachia alenae Willan, Köhler, Kessner & Braby, 2009
 Torresitrachia bathurstensis (Smith, 1894) 
 Torresitrachia cuttacutta Willan, Köhler, Kessner & Braby, 2009
 Torresitrachia crawfordi Solem, 1979
 Torresitrachia darwini Willan, Köhler, Kessner & Braby, 2009
 Torresitrachia funium Solem, 1981
 Torresitrachia monticola Iredale, 1939 
 Torresitrachia regula Solem, 1979 
 Torresitrachia stipata Iredale, 1938 
 Torresitrachia thedana Solem, 1985 
 Torresitrachia torresiana (Hombron & Jacquinot, 1841) 
 Torresitrachia wallacei Willan, Köhler, Kessner & Braby, 2009
 Torresitrachia weaberana Solem, 1979

References

 
Camaenidae
Taxonomy articles created by Polbot